Derek Owen Froude (born 20 April 1959 in Wellington) is a former long-distance runner from New Zealand, who represented his native country at two Summer Olympics: 1984 (Los Angeles) and 1992 (Barcelona). He finished in 34th and 35th place in the men's marathon. He set his personal best (2:11:25) in the classic distance in 1983.

Achievements
All results regarding marathon, unless stated otherwise

References

1959 births
Living people
New Zealand male long-distance runners
Athletes (track and field) at the 1984 Summer Olympics
Athletes (track and field) at the 1992 Summer Olympics
Olympic athletes of New Zealand
Athletes from Wellington City